Chrysocrambus brutiellus is a species of moth in the family Crambidae. Discovered in 1985, it is found in parts of Italy.

References

Moths described in 1985
Crambinae
Endemic fauna of Italy
Moths of Europe